"Shipwrecked" is the second single by British band Genesis, appearing on their 1997 album Calling All Stations. It was a minor hit, reaching No.54 in the UK and No.82 in Germany.

The song is classified as a break-up song.  The song sings about someone who has recently broken up with his significant other, and now feels "shipwrecked", hopeless, and alone.

Some single versions featured acoustic versions of "No Son of Mine", "Lover's Leap", and "Turn It On Again" as B-sides.

Track listings

CD single, part 1
Virgin / gendx14

CD single, part 2
Virgin / gensd14

Personnel
Ray Wilson – lead vocals
Tony Banks – keyboards, acoustic guitar, backing vocals 
Mike Rutherford – guitars, bass, backing vocals
Nir Zidkyahu – drums, percussion

References

1997 singles
Genesis (band) songs
Songs written by Tony Banks (musician)
Songs written by Mike Rutherford
1997 songs
Atlantic Records singles
Virgin Records singles